Mela is a Sanskrit word meaning "gathering" or "to meet" or a "fair".  It is used in the Indian subcontinent for all sizes of gatherings and can be religious, commercial, cultural or sport-related. In rural traditions melas or village fairs were (and in some cases still are) of great importance. This led to their export around the world by South Asian diaspora communities wishing to bring something of that tradition to their new countries.

In recent times "mela" also popularly refers to shows and exhibitions. It can be theme-based, promoting a particular culture, art or skill. Generally at "melas" people can find eateries, entertainment activities, shops and games.

The Kumbh Mela, held every twelve years, at Prayagraj, Haridwar, Nashik and Ujjain is one of the largest fairs in India, where over 60 million people gathered in January 2001, making it the largest gathering anywhere in the world.

Notable Melas in South Asia

India

 Gangasagar Mela at Sagar Island
 Gita Mahotsav
 Haridwar Kumbh Mela
 Jhiri Mela
 Kapal Mochan Mela, Haryana 
 Kumbh Mela

 Mela Maghi at Muktsar
 Minjar Mela
 Perfect Health Mela

 Nashik-Trimbakeshwar Simhastha

 Prayagraj Kumbh Mela
 Pushkar Fair
 Pushkaram – the river festivals of Karnataka, Andhra Pradesh and Telangana.

 Ratha-Yatra Mela
 Sonepur Cattle Fair
 Shaheedi Jor Mela

 Ujjain Simhastha

Bangladesh

 Pohela Boishakh Mela

Pakistan

 Mela Chiraghan

Usage outside South Asia
In modern usage outside South Asia it has become a term that shows widespread diversity of interpretation, just as has been the case in South Asia. One can find a Nepalese mela in the USA, or a Bengali mela in London, such as the Boishakhi Mela. The Boishakhi Mela is the largest open-air Asian festival in Europe and the largest Bengali festival outside of Bangladesh. After the Notting Hill Carnival, it is the second-largest street festival in the United Kingdom, attracting over 80,000 visitors from across the country. Many melas are wider intercultural (though mainly Asian) festivals incorporating music, dance, food and other aspects of mainstream culture.

Since the 1980s an increasing number of melas have regularly been held in larger towns outside south Asia, especially in the UK and North America. The larger melas tend to be those with larger ethnic minority populations, but many melas are held in communities with small South Asian diasporas. Community ownership of these melas is important to the South Asian communities, who see them as opportunities to share their cultural heritage with the mainstream. They are opportunities for bridge-building and community-building and can perform a strong socially cohesive function.

More successful outside-of-Asia melas tend to have a strongly diversified funding base with private/public/third sector collaboration. Public money is often spent on the melas. This reflects the mela organisers' and public authorities' joint conviction that, as in the sub-continent, melas are for everyone.

Notable Melas outside the Asian subcontinent
 Milan The Hague (The Netherlands)
 Oslo Mela Festival (Norway) 
 Belfast Mela   (UK)
 Birmingham Mela (UK)
 Boishakhi Mela (UK)
 Bradford Mela (UK)
 Cardiff Mela (UK)
 Edinburgh Mela (UK)
 Glasgow Mela (UK)
 London Mela (UK)
 Manchester Mega Mela (UK)
 Middlesbrough Mela (UK)
 Newcastle Mela (UK)
 Nottingham Mela (UK)
 Preston Mela (UK)
 Southampton Mela (UK)
 Brooklyn Mela, Coney Island Ave, New York (USA)
 Punjabi Mela, Centreville, VA (USA)

See also

 Parikrama
 Yatra

References

External links
 https://www.bbc.co.uk/news/uk-northern-ireland-49396598
 BBC list of UK Melas in 2010
 Makar Mela Panauti, Nepal

Sanskrit words and phrases
Hindu festivals
Festivals in India
Indian culture
Fairs in India
Fairs in Pakistan
Religious festivals in India

ml:മേള (ചലച്ചിത്രം)